WNBL may refer to:

 WNBL (FM), a radio station (107.3 FM) licensed to serve South Bristol Township, New York, United States
 Women's National Basketball League, an Australian professional women's basketball league
 Women's National Basketball League (Philippines), a Filipino professional women's basketball league
 WYSN, a radio station (1200 AM) licensed to serve Huntington, West Virginia, United States, which used the call sign WNBL from 2010 to 2011